Tomorrow Boy is a 5-episode South Korean web drama starring N, Kang Min-ah, Yoo Se-hyung and Moon Ji-in. Produced by the National Credit Union Federation of Korea (NACUFOK, or in local parlance, Sinhyeob), it was aired on Naver TV Cast from March 28 to April 11, 2016 with five episodes.

Synopsis 
Ahn Tae-pyung (N) is the eldest among four orphaned siblings living with their grandmother (Moon Hyung-joo). He is a high school student but takes up part-time jobs and also sells ddeokbokki in order to clear his dead father's debts and to take care of his younger siblings and grandmother. During a robbery at a burger shop, he saves Ah-ra (Kang Min-ah) from being taken hostage. Since then Ah-ra,  a rich girl from another school, has taken a liking for Tae-pyung. She would follow him whenever possible, would try to get his attention, and also try to impress him. The drama ends with Ah-ra trying to find out who is the guy whom Shin-young (Moon Ji-in), the credit union boss of Tae-pyung, is interested during Tae-pyung's birthday celebration at his house.

Cast

Main cast 
 N as Ahn Tae-pyung
 Kang Min-ah as Jo Ah-ra
 Yoo Se-hyung as Kim Nam-soo
 Moon Ji-in as Seo Shin-young

Others
 Yoon Hye-suk as Moneylender
 Baek Bong-ki as Myung-soo
 Jeon In-taek as Workshop boss
 Kim Jin-geun as Cafe boss
 Moon Hyung-joo as Grandmother

Original soundtracks

References

External links

2016 web series debuts
South Korean web series
2016 web series endings